Pobožje is a village in the municipality of Čučer-Sandevo, North Macedonia.

Demographics
As of the 2021 census, Pobožje had 710 residents with the following ethnic composition:
Macedonians 551
Serbs 112
Persons for whom data are taken from administrative sources 42
Others 5

According to the 2002 census, the village had a total of 591 inhabitants. Ethnic groups in the village include:
Macedonians 423 
Serbs 166
Others 2

References

Villages in Čučer-Sandevo Municipality